The AFL Hall of Fame Tribute Match was a one-off all-star game between two representative sides organised by the Australian Football League to celebrate the 150th anniversary of Australian rules football. The match was intended to celebrate the contribution of State of Origin and interstate matches to the history of the code.

The match was played on 10 May 2008 at the Melbourne Cricket Ground in Melbourne, Australia, between Victoria (the "Big V") and the "Dream Team", with a crowd of 69,294 in attendance.Victoria won the match by 17 points: 21.11 (137) to 18.12 (120).

Background

In 2007, the AFL announced that it would support a return of the State of Origin concept as a once-off carnival as part of the 150th anniversary of Australian rules football scheduled for 2008. The format of the carnival was not announced at this early stage.

The media featured several opinions on how the series could work without unduly interrupting the AFL season. There were suggestions that each state be individually represented, with a two division format to ensure that there would be no one-sided matches between the stronger states and the weaker states, and there were also suggestions for Victoria to be divided into separate Metro and Country, both of which are features of the annual AFL Under-18 Championships.

Many of the options that the AFL considered featured composite teams of weaker states, similar to the Allies team which represented Tasmania, Queensland, New South Wales and the Northern Territory collectively during State of Origin series in the 1990s.

By December, the vision for a full carnival had been reduced to a single all-star match, to be played between Victoria and the Dream Team, a composite team of all other states, territories and countries, on a State of Origin selection basis. The match would be held as a stand-alone match on the weekend between Rounds 7 and 8, on Saturday 10 May. 

South Australia's Graham Cornes was critical of the format, saying that it deprived non-Victorian players of the honour of wearing a state guernsey. He felt that each state should have been given the opportunity to field their own team.

Amid concerns over player participation, the AFL considered introducing penalties for selected players who refused to participate. Instead, players were paid A$5,000 each to compete in the match, and the players agreed to donate the money to the AFL Players Association to be to distributed to three charities, a special past players fund, the Ladder program to combat homelessness and RecLink, which funds football leagues in remote communities in the Northern Territory.

In early 2008 the AFL announced the full details of the match and branded it as the "AFL Hall of Fame Tribute Match", deliberately distancing it from the former State of Origin series. It promoted the event by announcing two captains would be Jonathon Brown (Victoria) and Andrew McLeod (Dream Team).

Victoria wore its traditional navy blue guernsey with a white V. The Dream Team wore a predominantly white guernsey, with beige cuffs and collars, and blue numbers and side panels; the names of 1246 community and grass-roots football clubs competing within the Australian states and territories eligible for the Dream Team were also included in small beige text across the front.

Squads

In April 2008 the AFL announced 40-man squads for both teams, which would later be trimmed to 25 per side. All AFL teams except Essendon and Melbourne had at least one player selected in one of the sides. The match was played with an extended interchange bench of seven players instead of four.

Several high-profile players pulled out of the match in the final weeks before the game. Gary Ablett Jr, Nick Dal Santo and Brad Johnson pulled out for Victoria, while Luke McPharlin and Irishman Tadhg Kennelly dropped out for the Dream Team.

Final teams

List

Allen Aylett Medal

The Allen Aylett Medal for best on ground was awarded to Brendan Fevola, who kicked six goals for Victoria.

Scorecard

See also
2008 AFL season
State of Origin for Bushfire Relief Match – contested in 2020 to raise funds for the recovery efforts following the 2019–20 Australian bushfire season

References

External links

 Official 150 years website 

Australian Football League
Australian rules football games
Australian rules football State of Origin
Hall of Fame
History of Australian rules football